Bishop Volodymyr Hrutsa  (born 19 August 1976 in Dobromyl, Lviv Oblast, Ukrainian SSR) is a Ukrainian Greek Catholic hierarch as the Titular Bishop of Bahanna and Auxiliary bishop of Lviv since 14 January 2016.

Life
Bishop Hrutsa, after graduation of the school education, joined the Congregation of the Most Holy Redeemer in 1994; he had a profession on 19 August 1995 and a solemn profession on 19 August 2001, and was ordained as priest on 12 July 2001, after graduation of the Major Redemptorists Theological Seminary in Tuchów, Poland and Pontifical Theological Academy in Kraków, Poland. Then he continued his studies in the University of Innsbruck, Austria with Doctor of Sacred Theology degree. During 2013–2016 he served as a Master of novices for the Ukrainian Redemptorists Province.

On 14 January 2016 he was confirmed by the Pope Francis as the second Auxiliary Bishop of Lviv, Ukraine and Titular Bishop of Bahanna. On 7 April 2016 he was consecrated as bishop by Major Archbishop Sviatoslav Shevchuk and other hierarchs of the Ukrainian Greek Catholic Church.

References

1976 births
Living people
People from Lviv Oblast
Pontifical University of John Paul II alumni
University of Innsbruck alumni
Redemptorists
Redemptorist bishops
Ukrainian Eastern Catholics
Bishops of the Ukrainian Greek Catholic Church